The Johor Darul Ta'zim III or simply known as JDT III (formerly known as Johor Pasir Gudang FC), is an under-21 football team. Johor Darul Ta'zim III is a feeder team for Johor Darul Ta'zim II F.C., which plays in the Malaysia Premier League.

The team currently plays in the Malaysia President Cup, the under-21 competition of the Malaysian football. JDT III is managed by Ervin Boban.

History

Club's names
 2015: Johor Darul Ta'zim III Football Club (Johor Darul Ta'zim III FC) (U23)
 2016: Johor Darul Ta'zim III Football Club (Johor Darul Ta'zim III FC) (U21)

Honours

Domestic

League

Cups
Malaysia President Cup

 Winners (2): 2009, 2022

Current squad

Johor Darul Ta'zim IV

Transfers

For recent transfers, see List of Malaysian football transfers 2020

Current coaching staff

References

External links
 

Youth and Academy
Football clubs in Malaysia
Malaysian reserve football teams
Football academies in Malaysia
2014 establishments in Malaysia